Kuttelwascher is a German surname meaning "tripe washer". Notable people include:

 Dietmar Kuttelwascher, Austrian rower
 Helmuth Kuttelwascher, Austrian rower
 Horst Kuttelwascher, Austrian rower
 Karel Kuttelwascher, Czech fighter pilot
 Otto Kuttelwascher, Austrian Righteous Among the Nations
 Volkmar Kuttelwascher, Austrian rower

German-language surnames